Evidence is a 1929 Pre-Code crime drama film produced and distributed by the Warner Brothers. It is based on the 1914 Broadway play Evidence by J. duRocher MacPherson and L. duRocher MacPherson. This early talkie was directed by John G. Adolfi and starred Pauline Frederick and Lowell Sherman. While this film is  lost, its soundtrack, recorded by the Vitaphone process, survives.

Cast
Pauline Frederick - Myra Stanhope
William Courtenay - Cyril Wimborne
Conway Tearle - Harold Courtenay
Lowell Sherman - Norman Pollock
Alec B. Francis - Harbison
Freddie Burke Frederick - Kenyon Wimborne
Madeline Seymour - Mrs. Debenham
Ivan F. Simpson - Peabody
Myrna Loy - Native Girl
Lionel Belmore - Innkeeper

References

External links

1929 films
American black-and-white films
American crime drama films
American films based on plays
Films directed by John G. Adolfi
Lost American films
Warner Bros. films
1929 crime drama films
1929 lost films
Lost crime drama films
1920s English-language films
1920s American films